Schrödinger, Inc. is an international scientific software company that specializes in developing computational tools and software for drug discovery and materials science. 

Schrodinger's software is used by pharmaceutical companies, biotech firms, and academic researchers to simulate and model the behavior of molecules at the atomic level. This accelerates the design and develops new drugs and materials more efficiently, reducing the time and cost of bringing them to market.

Schrodinger's suite of software tools includes molecular dynamics simulations, quantum mechanics calculations, and virtual screening tools, among others. The company also offers consulting services and collaborates with partners in the industry to advance the field of computational chemistry and drug discovery.

Products and Services
Schrödinger's computational platforms evaluate compounds in silico, with experimental accuracy on properties such as binding affinity and solubility. The company's products include molecular modeling programs, and an Enterprise Informatics Platform named LiveDesign, which is intended to facilitate communication among interdisciplinary research teams.

In addition to computational platforms, Schrödinger develops custom software for enterprises, as well as training, computer-cluster design and implementation, and research-based drug discovery projects.

Partners
Schrödinger's partners include pharmaceutical companies, including Bayer,  Takeda, and more.

Nimbus Therapeutics, co-founded by Schrödinger, uses Schrödinger's drug screening and design platform for drug discovery. In 2016, Nimbus Therapeutics sold an Acetyl-CoA carboxylase (ACC) inhibitor designed by Schrödinger to Gilead in a deal worth up to $1.2 billion. As of spring 2019 the ACC inhibitor was moving through late-stage clinical trials in NASH.

Recognition
In November 2013, Schrödinger, in collaboration with Cycle Computing and the University of Southern California, set a record for the world's largest and fastest cloud computing run by using 156,000 cores on Amazon Web Services to screen over 205,000 molecules for materials science research. That work was a follow up to a 2012 collaboration which saw Cycle Computing creating a 50,000 core virtual supercomputer using Amazon and Schrödinger's infrastructure, which at that time was used to analyze 2.1 million compounds in 3 hours.

References

External links
 

American companies established in 1990
Software companies based in New York City
Molecular modelling software
Publicly traded companies based in New York City
Research support companies
Life sciences industry
Companies listed on the Nasdaq
2020 initial public offerings
Software companies of the United States
1990 establishments in the United States
1990 establishments in New York City
Software companies established in 1990